The Company of Chivalry is a living history group portraying a military company in the age of Edward III (13 November 1312 – 21 June 1377), under the command of  Sir Thomas Hungerford (c. 1330 – 3 December 1397), a vassal of John of Gaunt, 1st Duke of Lancaster (March 6, 1340 – February 3, 1399).

The group performs at medieval reenactment events; with civilian living history and military combat display aspects. The Company of Chivalry is known for its display of daily life in a medieval camp and has a history of working closely with in the Castles of Wales for Cadw.  The Group has previously operated medieval siege engines in the United Kingdom, and has regularly displayed the use of four types of siege engine at Caerphilly Castle in South Wales. 

The society has set its effective date as 1370, during the Hundred Years War at a time when the English were ascendant against the armies of France. Within the society, the military aspect consists of soldiers who are primarily made up of billmen with a gunner in charge of a small black powder cannon, commanded by armoured knights.

Name 

There is not a single correct spelling for the name of the company; the group usually uses "The Company of Chivalry" or the more archaic "Ye Compaynye of Chivalrye"

Origins and History 
The Company of Chivalry was formed in 1988 by a group of people with a love for medieval England.  The aim of the society is to recreate the daily life, culture and technology of English society in the Plantagenet period of the late fourteenth century.

Membership 

Active members of the group live in the United Kingdom; the general membership is mostly drawn from the West Country (Somerset, Bristol, Wiltshire, Devon, and Gloucestershire).

Events 
The Company of Chivalry has primarily worked with Cadw and English Heritage, and some privately owned properties such as Pembroke Caste; and carries out living history events in close cooperation with them. The Group usually carries out events each year/season between Easter and September, in the UK.  In the past the Society developed strong links with Compagnia di Porta Giovia an Italian Reenactment Society based in Milan, Italy, and was able to travel to Morimondo, Italy annually to participate in a reenactment of The Battle of Casorate (1352) between Carlo IV of Bohemia and the Duke Visconti of Milan. The Society also attends private events.

Video
The Company of Chivalry at Farleigh Hungerford Castle June 2006
Battle of Casorate Reenactment May 2005

External links
Official Website of The Company of Chivalry
The Company of Chivalry Facebook Group

References
The Perfect King: The Life of Edward III, Father of the English Nation, Ian Mortimer,  (2006)
Skirmish Magazine
Bridgewater Mercury February 2008
Bristol University October 2002 
Blagdon Local History Society Review of Talk by Dr Andrew Newton on Medieval Medicine January 2004

Medieval reenactment
Historical reenactment groups
Organizations established in 1988
1988 establishments in England
1370s in England